San Siro is a Roman Catholic basilica located on the street of the same name, in the quartiere of the Maddalena in central Genoa, Liguria, Italy.

History
One of the oldest churches in the city, it occupies the site of a former church originally dedicated to the apostles. In later centuries, the church was renamed after St Syrus of Genoa, a beatified bishop. Originally the cathedral of Genoa, it stood outside of the original walls, and was vulnerable to attacks from Saracen pirates; the title of Cathedral was transferred to San Lorenzo. There is another church dedicated to San Siro, San Siro di Struppa, outside the city center.

Legend holds that the bishop was able to banish a Basilisk that dwelt in a well adjacent to the church; a plaque on a nearby house recalls the miracle.  This event is represented in a medieval bas relief on the portico arcade next to the church, as well as a fresco by Carlone in the apse. 

From the tenth to 12th centuries, building of the original Romanesque structure of the church and bell-tower proceeded. In 1478, a fire destroyed much of the church. Nearly a century later, prodded by Cardinal Vincenzo Giustiniani and the Pallavicini family, reconstruction was begun following the demands of Counter-Reformation architecture, with a main central nave. That nave was frescoed by Giovanni Battista Carlone with Conversion of St Peter, Martyrdom of St. Peter, and Death of Simon Magus. Paolo Brozzi completed the quadratura decoration. The chapel of the Pietà  was commissioned by Taddeo Carlone  in 1595 (and completed by  1606 by the marble-carvers Santino Paracca, called Valsoldo, and Alessandro Ferrandino). In 1904, the romanesque bell-tower, due to its perilous situation had to be demolished and was never rebuilt.

Other works of art include the Triumph of the Cross in the cupola by  Carlone, and canvases of  the Annunciation, Birth of Mary, and St Anthony  by Orazio Gentileschi (the brother of Aurelio Lomi). Other artists with paintings in the church include Domenico Fiasella, Giovanni Domenico Cappellino, Andrea Semino, Giacomo Lomellini, Cristoforo Roncalli, Gregorio De Ferrari, Domenico Piola (2nd chapel on right),  and a Decapitation of Saint by Carlo Bononi . The church contains a number of sculptures by Taddeo Carlone. The main altar design and sculpture were completed by Pierre Puget.

References

Sources 

Siro
16th-century Roman Catholic church buildings in Italy
Renaissance architecture in Liguria